Whirl Tour is a sports video game developed by Papaya Studio and co-published by Crave Entertainment and Vivendi Universal Games for GameCube and PlayStation 2.

Story
The band Flipside is performing at a sold-out show when all the band members are abruptly sucked into a portal. The band's roadie, Wasa B, jumps on his scooter and rides into the portal after the kidnapped musicians. Wasa B. must skate through eight unique levels, defeat the bosses who guard the portal's power source, and finally face-off with the evil Dr. Skeezkicks, who masterminded the abduction. Each area possesses its own special challenges, and the player will need to master all of the tricks at Wasa B.'s disposal to emerge victorious and save his friends.

Gameplay
The game plays out on scooters. Different buttons allow you to perform various tricks. There are six different modes you can play in, eight different levels, seven unlockable characters and ten unlockable scooters. In each Story Mode and Co-op Story Mode level, there are seven objectives to finish. There are simple objectives like to perform a certain trick in a certain spot or topple over something while grinding. Other objectives include getting a certain score, recovering 3 music discs, defeat the two bosses and destroy the generator. Race levels where the player is put against the computer are unlocked by destroying the generator in a level. Special Bonus Levels can be unlocked by finishing all objectives in one level.

References

External links

2002 video games
GameCube games
Extreme sports video games
PlayStation 2 games
Video games developed in the United States
Crave Entertainment games
Multiplayer and single-player video games
Video games using Havok
Papaya Studio games